The Press is a local, daily, paid for, newspaper, for North and East Yorkshire. It is published in the City of York by Newsquest Media Group Ltd, a subsidiary of Gannett Company Inc.

The Yorkshire Evening Press was established in 1882. It changed from broadsheet to compact format in 2004 and shortly afterwards dropped "Yorkshire" from the title. Morning printing began on 24 April 2006, and the paper was given its present name.

William Wallace Hargrove printed at 9 Coney Street. Paper was delivered by barge along the River Ouse. In 1989, publication moved to Walmgate.

The Press has run campaigns including their Guardian Angels Appeal and Change It.

Circulation

ABC print circulation for second half of year:

References

External links
Official website

1882 establishments in England
Newspapers published by Newsquest
Newspapers published in Yorkshire
Publications established in 1882
Mass media in York
Daily newspapers published in the United Kingdom